The 1936 Iowa State Cyclones football team represented Iowa State College of Agricultural and Mechanic Arts (later renamed Iowa State University) in the Big Six Conference during the 1936 college football season. In their sixth and final season under head coach George F. Veenker, the Cyclones compiled a 3–3–2 record (1–3–1 against conference opponents), finished in fifth place in the conference, and were outscored by opponents by a combined total of 112 to 94. They played their home games at State Field in Ames, Iowa.

End Clarence Gustine was the team captain. Gustine was also selected as a first-team all-conference player.

Schedule

References

Iowa State
Iowa State Cyclones football seasons
Iowa State Cyclones football